Subleuconycta is a genus of moths of the family Noctuidae. The genus was erected by Igor Vasilii Kozhanchikov (Kozhantshikov) in 1950.

Species
Subleuconycta calonesiota Kiss, Wu & Matov, 2017 Taiwan
Subleuconycta palshkovi (Filipjev, 1937) Ussuri, Korea, north-eastern China, Japan
Subleuconycta sola Gyulai & Saldaitis, 2017 Sichuan
Subleuconycta sugii Boursin, 1962 Taiwan

References

Acronictinae